The 1980 Brownlow Medal was the 53rd year the award was presented to the player adjudged the fairest and best player during the Victorian Football League (VFL) home and away season. Kelvin Templeton of the Footscray Football Club won the medal by polling twenty-three votes during the 1980 VFL season.

Leading votegetters

References 

1980 in Australian rules football
1980